Akram Khan may refer to:

Nawab Sir Muhammad Akram Khan (1868–1907), a former ruler of Amb
Mohammad Akram Khan (1868–1969), Bengali journalist and politician
Akram Khan Durrani (born 1958), Pakistani politician
Rana Muhammad Akram Khan (born 1962), Pakistani lawyer
Akram Khan (cricketer) (born 1968), Bangladeshi cricketer
Akram Khan (politician) (born 1970), Indian politician
Akram Khan (dancer) (born 1974), English dancer

See also
Akram (disambiguation)
Khan (disambiguation)